Morton Dauwen Zabel (1901 – April 29, 1964) was an American academic and literary critic. He was the editor-in-chief of Poetry: A Magazine of Verse from 1936 to 1937, the first professor of North American Literature at the Federal University of Rio de Janeiro from 1944 to 1946, and an English professor at the University of Chicago from 1947 to 1964. According to the Poetry Foundation, he was "an important force in mid-20th century American letters."

Early life
Zabel was born in 1901 in Minnesota Lake, Minnesota. He graduated from St. Thomas Military College, where he earned a bachelor's degree. He earned a master's degree from the University of Minnesota and a Ph.D. from the University of Chicago in 1933.

Career
Zabel was an associate editor of Poetry: A Magazine of Verse from 1928 to 1936, and its editor-in-chief from 1936 to 1937. He was the first professor of North American Literature at the Federal University of Rio de Janeiro from 1944 to 1946. He was a professor of English at the University of Chicago from 1947 to 1964.

Zabel authored or edited books about Henry James and Joseph Conrad. He wrote introductions in books by Joseph Conrad, Charles Dickens, Henry James, and he reviewed books and wrote essays for The New Republic, Partisan Review, The Nation, and The Southern Review. According to the Poetry Foundation, he was "an important force in mid-20th century American letters."

Personal life, death and legacy
Zabel never married. He died on April 29, 1964, in Chicago. His funeral was held at the St John's Catholic Church in Minnesota Lake, where he was buried. Zabel is the namesake of the American Academy of Arts and Letters' Morton Dauwen Zabel Award.

Selected works

References

External links 

 Morton Dauwen Zabel Papers at the Newberry
Guide to the Morton Dauwen Zabel Papers 1901-1964 at the University of Chicago Special Collections Research Center

1901 births
1964 deaths
University of Minnesota alumni
University of Chicago alumni
American magazine editors
Academic staff of the Federal University of Rio de Janeiro
University of Chicago faculty
American literary critics